Artistic swimming competitions at the 2023 Pan American Games in Santiago, Chile are scheduled to be held between November 2 and 5, 2023 at the Aquatic Center in the National Stadium Park cluster.

Qualification

A total of 80 artistic swimmers will qualify to compete at the games. As host nation, Chile qualifies the maximum team size of nine athletes. Seven other teams will qualify (each with nine athletes). Each team will also be required to compete in the duet event with athletes already qualified for the team event. A further four countries will qualify a duet only.

Participating nations
A total of 7 countries qualified athletes.

Medal summary

Medal table

Medalists

See also
Artistic swimming at the 2024 Summer Olympics

References

 
Artistic swimming
Pan American Games
2023